The Libertarian Party of Colorado is the state affiliate of the Libertarian Party in Colorado. The state chair is Wayne Harlos.

Elected libertarians in Colorado include city councilmen Doug Anderson in Lakewood, Colorado, Joe Johnson in Frederick, Colorado, and Sheriff Bill Masters in San Miguel County.

In 2016, the party's voter registration exceeded one percent of registered voters entitling the party's Senate candidate, Lily Tang Williams, to participate in the debates.  Colorado has the second highest percentage of registered Libertarians in any state, behind Alaska.

See also
 List of state Libertarian Parties in the United States
 Nicholas Sarwark

References

External links
 
 Libertarian Party of Colorado – via lpedia.org

Colorado
Political parties in Colorado
Political parties established in 1971